The W45 was a multipurpose American nuclear warhead developed in the early 1960s, first built in 1962 and fielded in some applications until 1988. The yields of different W45 versions were 0.5, 1, 5, 8, 10, and 15 kilotons. The W45 was designed at the Livermore branch of the University of California Radiation Laboratory (UCRL), now Lawrence Livermore National Laboratory.

The W45 used a common nuclear fission core called the Robin primary, which was used as the fission primary in the thermonuclear W38 and W47 weapons.

Applications of the W45 warhead included:
 Little John SSM
 Terrier SAM
 Medium Atomic Demolition Munition or MADM
 Bullpup ASM

See also
 List of nuclear weapons
 Robin primary

External links
 Allbombs.html list of all US nuclear warheads at nuclearweaponarchive.org

Nuclear warheads of the United States
Military equipment introduced in the 1960s